The Ford B-Max (stylized as Ford B-MAX) code name: B232, is a mini MPV (M-segment) manufactured by Ford Europe from 2012 to 2017. Built on the Ford global B platform, it was initially unveiled as a concept car at the 2011 Geneva Motor Show, and was officially launched at the 2012 Mobile World Congress in Barcelona.

Production began in June 2012, and marketing of the first units started during late July. It was launched in the United Kingdom on 1 September 2012. The B-Max is based on the Ford Fiesta, and its main rivals were the Fiat 500L, the Citroën C3 Picasso and the Nissan Note.



Overview
The styling of the B-Max continues the Ford Kinetic Design theme, and has rear sliding doors with no B-pillars. The B-Max is available with the new 1.0-litre three-cylinder engine of the Ford EcoBoost family, that features turbocharged direct injection and start-stop system. 

This engine officially won the title of "International Engine of the Year 2012". The 1.6-litre Duratec engine can be fitted with the PowerShift six speed dual-clutch automatic gearbox.

It has three different trim levels: Studio, Zetec and Titanium. The Studio is the basic model, and it is available only with the 1.4-litre engine. The first B-Max was bought by the President of Romania, Traian Băsescu, on 25 June 2012, directly from the Craiova plant. In September 2017, production of B-Max ended, due to dwindling demand for the model, as well as a general decline in sales of mini MPVs. 

Unusually for a Ford, this model did not receive a mid-cycle facelift in order to boost sales, the closest successors were intended as the EcoSport as well as the Fiesta Active, transitions from MPV to SUV design.

Technology
The B-Max features the "Intelligent Protection" system. It also featured Ford's Torque Vectoring Control, which improves handling and agility, and the SYNC and Fold Flat systems. Ford's Emergency Assistance feature alerts local emergency services operators after an accident, in the correct language for the region. It was available in more than thirty countries, mostly in Europe.

Safety
The Ford B-Max was tested by Euro NCAP in September 2012, receiving a five star safety rating.

Reviews
The Telegraph reviewed the B-Max on 28 August 2012. The reviewer, Andrew English, gave the car a 4 out of 5 stars, and his verdict was that it “brings something new and useful to the market”.

What Car? magazine rated the B-Max with 4 out of 5 (later 3 out of 5) stars, giving the car a positive review.

Engines

Sales

References

External links

Official website (archived)

B-Max
Ford B3 platform
B-Max
Mini MPVs
Station wagons
Euro NCAP small MPVs
2010s cars
Cars introduced in 2012